Maishashan Silchar Passenger is a passenger train belonging to Northeast Frontier Railway zone of Indian Railways that connects the border town & the second largest city of Assam, that is, Maishashan & Silchar. The train runs two times each from Maishashan & Silchar, every day. The train makes its main halt at Karimganj Junction for 10 mins. The train runs with WDP-4

Service

Major Halts
 Maishashan; Start
 Karimganj Junction
 Badarpur Junction
 Katakhal Junction
 Arunachal Junction
 Silchar; End

References

External links
 55661/ Maishashan Silchar Passenger
 55685/ Maishashan Silchar Passenger
 55662/ Silchar Maishashan Passenger
 55686/ Silchar Maishashan Passenger

Express trains in India
Rail transport in Assam